Sarcochilus hillii, commonly known as myrtle bells,  is a small epiphytic orchid native to eastern Australia and New Caledonia. It has up to ten drooping, quill-shaped leaves and up to ten frosty white or pink flowers that have a hairy labellum with purple stripes.

Description
The side lobes are erect with purple stripes on the inside surface the middle lobe is densely hairy. Flowering occurs between October and December but only a few flowers are open at once.

Taxonomy and naming
Myrtle bells was first formally described in 1859 by Ferdinand von Mueller who gave it the name Dendrobium hillii and published the description in Fragmenta phytographiae Australiae from a specimen collected near Moreton Bay by Walter Hill (garden curator). In 1860, Mueller changed the name to Sarcochilus hillii. The specific epithet (hillii) honours the collector of the type specimen.

In 2019, a variety, S. hillii var. thycola was raised to species rank as Sarcochilus thycola in the Australian Orchid Review.

Distribution and habitat
Sarcochilus hillii usually grows on trees in rainforest, often on Backhousia myrtifolia and occasionally on rocks. It is found between Rockhampton in Queensland and Bega in New South Wales and it also occurs in New Caledonia.

References

hillii
Endemic orchids of Australia
Orchids of New South Wales
Orchids of Queensland
Orchids of New Caledonia
Plants described in 1859
Taxa named by Ferdinand von Mueller